The Summit Reno is an upscale lifestyle center located in Reno, Nevada. The center opened in 2007 and it is owned by Birmingham, Alabama-based Bayer Properties.

It offers more than 65 stores with different goods. It is located on the address of 13925 South Virginia Street - NV 89511. The venues that can be found there are both retail shops and dining restaurants.  Sometimes, fountains, and live music are featured, especially during holiday shopping.

The Reno Summit is also known for the Century Summit Movie theater, which often showcases the premiering movies from Hollywood.

Anchor tenants
 Century Theatres
 Dillard's
 Old Navy
 Orvis

See also
 The Summit (Birmingham)
 Paddock Shops, formerly known as The Summit of Louisville
 Meadowood Mall

References

External links
 The Summit Official Website

Shopping malls in Nevada
Lifestyle centers (retail)
Shopping malls established in 2007
Shopping districts and streets in the United States
Buildings and structures in Reno, Nevada
Tourist attractions in Reno, Nevada